The Bravo Otto is a German accolade honoring excellence of performers in film, television and music.  Established in 1957, the award is presented annually, with winners selected by the readers of Bravo magazine.  The award is presented in gold, silver and bronze and, since 1996, an honorary platinum statuette presented for lifetime achievement.

History
The award was originally presented only to actors, however, in 1960, additional categories were created to recognize musical artists.  Over time, various categories have been expanded while other categories have been merged or phased out altogether.  As of 2011, the Bravo Otto is presented in a total of 11 competitive categories; Male Film Star, Female Film Star, Male TV Star, Female TV Star, Male Super Singer, Female Super Singer, Super Rapper, Super Rock Band, Super Pop Band, Comedy Star and Internet Star.

From 1957 to 1972, The Bravo Otto award ceremony was presented at the beginning of each year.  Beginning in 1972, the date of the ceremony was moved to the end of the year, resulting in the awards being presented twice for the 1972 calendar year. Since 1994, the ceremony has been presented in a one-hour annual show called Der Bravo-Supershow – Die Gold-Otto-Verleihung (roughly translated as The Bravo-Supershow – The Gold Otto Awards) and is broadcast annually on German television.

The Otto awards are also presented in other European countries where Bravo publishes regional versions of the magazine.  The most notable of these countries include Russia, the Czech Republic and Poland. In Hungary, the awards are presented in an annual ceremony which is broadcast on television, similar to the German ceremony.

Categories 
The following categories have been awarded by the Otto's throughout its history, with some categories having been split or merged over time.

 band: 1966–1985, 1999, since 2008
 band pop: 1994–1998, 2000–2007
 band rock/pop: 1986–1993
 band rock: 1994–1998, 2000–2007
 band hard 'n heavy: 1986–1993
 school band: 2005
 singer: 2008
 male singer: since 1960–2007, since 2010
 female singer: since 1960–2007, since 2010
 duo: 1977
 hip-hop: 1998–1999
 hip-hop international: 2000–2007
 hip-hop national: 2000–2007
 dancefloor: 1991–1992, 1994
 rap & dancefloor: 1993
 rap & techno: 1994
 shootingstar: 2003–2004, 2007, since 2010
 shootingstar band: 2001–2002
 shootingstar solo: 2001–2002
 shootingstar male: 2000
 shootingstar female: 2000
 actor/actress: since 2008
 actor: 1957–2007
 actress: 1957–2007
 TV-star: 2008
 TV-Star male: since 1961–2007, since 2010
 TV-Star female: since 1961–2007, since 2010
 comedy-star: 2000–2007
 TV-moderator: 1989–1994
 male TV moderator: 1975
 female TV moderator: 1975
 athlete: 1973, 1983–1987, 2009
 male athlete: 1972 JE, 1974–1982, 1988–1993
 female athlete: 1972 JE, 1974–1982, 1988–1993
 wrestler: 1992–1993
 film: 2009
 German film: 1978
 special OTTO: 2001–2004, 2006–2007

Bravo Supershow 
From 1994 until 2010, the Bravo Otto ceremony was shown on private German broadcaster RTL, RTL II and ProSieben.  The following is a list of hosts for each year's ceremony.
 1994: Kristiane Backer; RTL II
 1995: Kristiane Backer; RTL II
 1996: Heike Makatsch; RTL II
 1997: Jasmin Gerat and DJ BoBo; RTL II
 1998:  and DJ BoBo; RTL II
 1999: Nova Meierhenrich and Florian Walberg; RTL II
 2002:  and Jessica Schwarz; RTL
 2003:  and Janin Reinhardt; RTL
 2004:  und Susan Sideropoulos; RTL
 2005: Gülcan Kamps und ; RTL
 2006: Oliver Pocher; ProSieben
 2007: Gülcan Kamps, Annemarie Carpendale and Elton; ProSieben
 2008: Mirjam Weichselbraun and Miriam Pielhau; RTL II
 2010:  and Louisa Mazzurana; RTL II

Winners (Gold – Silver – Bronze)

1957 
 actor: James Dean – Horst Buchholz – Burt Lancaster
 actress: Maria Schell – Gina Lollobrigida – Romy Schneider

1958 
 actor: Horst Buchholz – O. W. Fischer – Rock Hudson
 actress: Romy Schneider – Maria Schell – Ruth Leuwerik

1959 
 actor: O. W. Fischer – Peter Kraus – Hardy Krüger
 actress: Ruth Leuwerik – Romy Schneider – Sabine Sinjen

1960 
 actor: O. W. Fischer – Hardy Krüger – Christian Wolff
 actress: Sabine Sinjen – Ruth Leuwerik – Liselotte Pulver
 male singer: Freddy Quinn – Peter Kraus – Elvis Presley
 female singer: Conny Froboess – Caterina Valente – Heidi Brühl

1961 
 actor: O. W. Fischer – Hansjörg Felmy – Rock Hudson
 actress: Ruth Leuwerik – Sabine Sinjen – Liselotte Pulver
 male singer: Freddy Quinn – Peter Kraus – Rex Gildo
 female singer: Caterina Valente – Heidi Brühl – Conny Froboess
 TV star male: Willy Millowitsch – Hans-Joachim Kulenkampff (Kleine Stadt – ganz groß) – Joachim Fuchsberger (Zu viele Köche)
 TV star female: Inge Meysel (Das Fenster zum Flur) –  (NDR continuity announcer) –  (Kleine Stadt – ganz groß)

1962 
 actor: O. W. Fischer – Rock Hudson – Anthony Perkins
 actress: Ruth Leuwerik – Christine Kaufmann – Sophia Loren
 male singer: Freddy Quinn – Gus Backus – Peter Kraus
 female singer: Connie Francis – Caterina Valente – Conny Froboess
 TV star male: Heinz Drache – Willy Millowitsch – Lou van Burg (Sing mit mir, spiel mit mir)
 TV star female: Inge Meysel –  (NDR continuity announcer) – Margot Trooger

1963 
 actor Rock Hudson – O. W. Fischer – Anthony Perkins
 actress Sophia Loren – Ruth Leuwerik – Liselotte Pulver
 male singer: Freddy Quinn – Gus Backus – Rex Gildo
 female singer: Connie Francis – Caterina Valente – Conny Froboess
 TV star male: Edd Byrnes (77 Sunset Strip) – Robert Fuller (Laramie) – Lou van Burg (Sing mit mir, spiel mit mir)
 TV star female: Inge Meysel – Margot Trooger – Cordula Trantow

1964 
 actor: Thomas Fritsch – Rock Hudson – Pierre Brice
 actress: Sophia Loren – Liselotte Pulver – Doris Day
 male singer: Cliff Richard – Freddy Quinn – Rex Gildo
 female singer: Connie Francis – Conny Froboess – Rita Pavone
 TV star male: Robert Fuller (Laramie) – Edd Byrnes (77 Sunset Strip) – 
 TV star female: Inge Meysel –  (NDR continuity announcer) – Donna Reed (The Donna Reed Show)

1965 
 actor: Pierre Brice – Thomas Fritsch – Lex Barker
 actress: Marie Versini – Sophia Loren – Doris Day
 male singer: Cliff Richard – The Beatles – Freddy Quinn
 female singer: Gitte – Manuela – Connie Francis
 TV star male: Robert Fuller (Laramie) – Edd Byrnes (77 Sunset Strip) – Michael Landon (Bonanza)
 TV star female:  (NDR continuity announcer) – Donna Reed (The Donna Reed Show) – Marianne Koch

1966 
 actor: Pierre Brice – Sean Connery – Thomas Fritsch
 actress: Marie Versini – Sophia Loren – Liselotte Pulver
 male singer: Drafi Deutscher – Roy Black – Rex Gildo
 female singer: Manuela – Françoise Hardy – Wencke Myhre
 TV star male: Robert Fuller (Laramie) – Hans-Joachim Kulenkampff – Edd Byrnes (77 Sunset Strip)
 TV star female:  (NDR continuity announcer) – Inge Meysel (Die Unverbesserlichen) – Marianne Koch
 band: The Beatles – The Rolling Stones –

1967 
 actor: Pierre Brice – Horst Buchholz – Sean Connery
 actress: Marie Versini – Liselotte Pulver – Uschi Glas
 male singer: Roy Black – Graham Bonney – Udo Jürgens
 female singer: Wencke Myhre – Manuela – 
 TV star male: Roger Moore (The Saint) – Dietmar Schönherr (Raumpatrouille Orion) – Robert Fuller (Laramie)
 TV star female: Helga Anders (Die Unverbesserlichen) – Inge Meysel (Die Unverbesserlichen) –  (ZDF continuity announcer)
 band: Dave Dee, Dozy, Beaky, Mick & Tich – The Beatles – The Beach Boys

1968 
 actor: Pierre Brice – George Nader – Robert Hoffmann
 actress: Marie Versini – Helga Anders – Liselotte Pulver
 male singer: Roy Black – Graham Bonney – Ricky Shayne
 female singer: Wencke Myhre – Manuela – Peggy March
 TV star male: Patrick Macnee (The Avengers) – David McCallum (The Man from U.N.C.L.E.) – Roger Moore (The Saint)
 TV star female: Diana Rigg (The Avengers) – Marianne Koch – Inge Meysel (Die Unverbesserlichen)
 Band: Bee Gees – The Beatles – The Monkees

1969 
 actor: Pierre Brice – Robert Hoffmann – George Nader
 actress: Uschi Glas – Marie Versini – Senta Berger
 male singer: Roy Black – Udo Jürgens – Barry Ryan
 female singer: Manuela – Wencke Myhre – France Gall
 TV star male: Michael Landon (Bonanza) – Roger Moore (The Saint) – Patrick Macnee (The Avengers)
 TV star female Diana Rigg (The Avengers) – Inge Meysel (Die Unverbesserlichen) – Helga Anders (Die Unverbesserlichen)
 band: Bee Gees – The Beatles – Lords

1970 
 actor: Pierre Brice – Joachim Fuchsberger – Hansi Kraus
 actress: Uschi Glas – Gila von Weitershausen – Marie Versini
 male singer: Roy Black – Barry Ryan – Ricky Shayne
 female singer: Manuela – France Gall – Wencke Myhre
 TV star male: Mark Slade (The High Chaparral) – Henry Darrow (The High Chaparral) – Claus Wilcke (Percy Stuart)
 TV star female: Inge Meysel (Die Unverbesserlichen) – Linda Cristal (The High Chaparral) – Linda Evans (The Big Valley)
 band: The Beatles – The Archies – The Hollies

1971 
 actor: Pierre Brice – Hansi Kraus – Peter Fonda
 actress: Uschi Glas – Romy Schneider – Gila von Weitershausen
 male singer: Chris Roberts – Roy Black – Peter Alexander
 female singer Manuela – Daliah Lavi – France Gall
 TV star male: Joachim Fuchsberger (11 Uhr 20) – Fritz Wepper (Der Kommissar) – Claus Wilcke (Percy Stuart)
 TV star female: Peggy Lipton (The Mod Squad) – Inge Meysel (Die Unverbesserlichen) – Marianne Koch (Die Journalistin)
 band: Creedence Clearwater Revival – Bee Gees – Deep Purple

Beginning of 1972 
 actor: Ryan O'Neal – Pierre Brice – Hansi Kraus
 actress: Uschi Glas – Ali MacGraw – Romy Schneider
 male singer: Chris Roberts – Ricky Shayne – Roy Black
 female singer: Daliah Lavi – Manuela – Katja Ebstein
 TV star male: Claus Wilcke (Percy Stuart) – Joachim Fuchsberger (Heißer Sand) – Amadeus August (Quentin Durward)
 TV star female: Inge Meysel (Die Unverbesserlichen) – Barbara Eden (I Dream of Jeannie) – Linda Cristal (The High Chaparral)
 band: T. Rex – Middle of the Road – The Sweet

End of 1972 
 actor: Ron Ely – Ryan O'Neal – Terence Hill
 actress: Uschi Glas – Ali MacGraw – 
 male singer: Jürgen Marcus – Chris Roberts – Neil Diamond
 female singer: Juliane Werding – Melanie – Daliah Lavi
 TV star male: Tony Curtis (The Persuaders!) – Roger Moore (The Persuaders!) – Leonard Nimoy (Star Trek)
 TV star female: Barbara Eden (I Dream of Jeannie) – Juliet Mills (Nanny and the Professor) – Sabine Sinjen
 band: The Sweet – T. Rex – Alice Cooper
 male athlete: Mark Spitz – Günter Netzer – Gerd Müller
 female athlete: Heide Rosendahl – Ulrike Meyfarth – Monika Pflug

1973 
 actor: Jan-Michael Vincent – Roger Moore – Terence Hill
 actress: Uschi Glas – Jane Seymour – Ali MacGraw
 male singer: David Cassidy – Bernd Clüver – Jürgen Marcus
 female singer: Suzi Quatro – Ireen Sheer – Daliah Lavi
 TV star male: Horst Janson (Der Bastian) –  – Dack Rambo (The Guns of Will Sonnett)
 TV star female: Susan Dey (The Partridge Family) –  – Monika Lundi
 band: The Sweet – The Osmonds – Slade
 athlete: Gerd Müller – Günter Netzer – Erwin Kremers

1974 
 actor: Terence Hill – Jan-Michael Vincent – Roger Moore
 actress:  – Uschi Glas – Linda Blair
 male singer: David Cassidy – Bernd Clüver – Jürgen Marcus
 female singer: Suzi Quatro – Elfi Graf – Maggie Mae
 TV star male: Steve Hodson (Follyfoot) – Oliver Tobias (Arthur of the Britons) – Michael Gray (The Brian Keith Show)
 TV star female: Susan Dey (The Partridge Family) – Gillian Blake (Follyfoot) –  (Arpad, the Gypsy)
 band: The Sweet – ABBA – The Osmonds
 male athlete: Gerd Müller – Francisco Marinho – Franz Beckenbauer
 female athlete: Ulrike Meyfarth – Rosi Mittermaier – Uta Schorn

1975 
 actor: Terence Hill – Jan-Michael Vincent – Louis de Funès
 actress:  – Linda Blair – Christiane Gött
 male singer: David Cassidy – Albert Hammond – Jürgen Marcus
 female singer: Juliane Werding – Penny McLean – Suzi Quatro
 TV star male: Michael Douglas (The Streets of San Francisco) – Peter Falk (Columbo) – Michael Gray (The Brian Keith Show)
 TV star female: Susan Dey (The Partridge Family) – Gillian Blake (Follyfoot) – Ingrid Steeger
 male TV moderator: Ilja Richter (Disco) – Rudi Carrell (Am laufenden Band) – Michael Schanze
 female TV moderator: Uschi Nerke (Musikladen) –  (HR continuity announcer) –  (ZDF continuity announcer)
 band: Bay City Rollers – The Sweet – ABBA
 male athlet: Sepp Maier – Gerd Müller – Franz Beckenbauer
 female athlet: Ulrike Meyfarth – Ellen Wellmann – Anne, Princess Royal

1976 
 actor: Pierre Brice – Terence Hill – Jan-Michael Vincent
 actress: Sophia Loren –  – Uschi Glas
 male singer: Shaun Cassidy – Jürgen Drews – David Cassidy
 female singer: Tina Charles – Penny McLean – Marianne Rosenberg
 TV star male: Michael Douglas (The Streets of San Francisco) – Oliver Tobias (Arthur of the Britons) – Simon Turner
 TV star female: Susan Dey (The Partridge Family) – Ingrid Steeger – Uschi Nerke (Musikladen)
 band: Bay City Rollers – The Sweet – ABBA
 male athlete: Sepp Maier – Franz Beckenbauer – Gerd Müller
 female athlete: Rosi Mittermaier – Nadia Comăneci – Annegret Richter

1977 
 actor: Pierre Brice – Leif Garrett – Terence Hill
 actress: Nastassja Kinski – Uschi Glas – Romy Schneider
 male singer: Shaun Cassidy – Jürgen Drews – Frank Zander
 female singer: Bonnie Tyler –  – Marianne Rosenberg
 duo: Baccara – Hoffmann & Hoffmann – The Bellamy Brothers
 TV star male:  – Christopher Stone (Spencer's Pilots) – Thomas Fritsch
 TV star female: Jutta Speidel – Ingrid Steeger – Barbara Bain (Space: 1999)
 band: Smokie – Bay City Rollers – ABBA
 male athlete Sepp Maier – Klaus Fischer – Hansi Müller
 female athlet: Annegret Richter – Dagmar Lurz – Evi Mittermaier

1978 
 actor: John Travolta – Bud Spencer – Pierre Brice
 actress: Nastassja Kinski – Olivia Pascal – Karen Lynn Gorney
 German films: Lo chiamavano Bulldozer – Popcorn and Ice Cream – Passion Flower Hotel
 male singer: Leif Garrett – Jürgen Drews – Shaun Cassidy
 female singer: Olivia Newton-John – Amanda Lear – Suzi Quatro
 TV star male: Paul Michael Glaser (Starsky & Hutch) – Sascha Hehn (The Outsiders) – Richard Hatch (The Streets of San Francisco)
 TV star female: Ingrid Steeger (Zwei himmlische Töchter) – Jutta Speidel – Catherine Schell (Space: 1999)
 band: Smokie – ABBA – 
 male athlete: Hansi Müller – Sepp Maier – Kevin Keegan
 female athlete: Dagmar Lurz – Annegret Richter – Evi Mittermaier

1979 
 actor: John Travolta – Bud Spencer – Roger Moore
 actress: Olivia Pascal – Nastassja Kinski – Liz Taylor
 male singer: Leif Garrett – Peter Maffay – Patrick Hernandez
 female singer: Olivia Newton-John – Donna Summer – Suzi Quatro
 TV star male: Kabir Bedi (Sandokan) – Paul Michael Glaser (Starsky & Hutch) – 
 TV star female: Farrah Fawcett (Charlie's Angels) – Kristy McNichol (Family) – Jaclyn Smith (Charlie's Angels)
 band:  – ABBA – Smokie
 male athlete: Hansi Müller – Kevin Keegan – Björn Borg
 female athlete: Christa Kinshofer – Annegret Richter – Dagmar Lurz

1980 
 actor: Matt Dillon – Terence Hill – John Travolta
 actress: Kristy McNichol – Olivia Pascal – Tatum O’Neal
 male singer: Leif Garrett – Peter Maffay – Cliff Richard
 female singer: Olivia Newton-John – Suzi Quatro – Diana Ross
 TV star male: Robert Urich (Vegas) – Thomas Ohrner (Timm Thaler) – Thomas Gottschalk (Telespiele)
 TV star female: Farrah Fawcett (Charlie's Angels) – Désirée Nosbusch (Hits von der Schulbank) – Jaclyn Smith (Charlie's Angels)
 band:  – ABBA – KISS
 male athlete: Karl-Heinz Rummenigge – Hansi Müller – Björn Borg
 female athlete: Christa Kinshofer – Dagmar Lurz – Tina Riegel

1981 
 actor: Roger Moore – Matt Dillon – Christopher Atkins
 actress: Farrah Fawcett – Kristy McNichol – Brooke Shields
 male singer: Shakin' Stevens – Roland Kaiser – Marius Müller-Westernhagen
 female singer: Kim Wilde – Olivia Newton-John – Helen Schneider
 TV star male Patrick Duffy (Dallas) – Robert Urich (Vegas) – Sascha Hehn
 TV star female Victoria Principal (Dallas) – Désirée Nosbusch – Charlene Tilton (Dallas)
 band: Adam & The Ants –  – ABBA
 male athlete: Karl-Heinz Rummenigge – Pierre Littbarski – Hansi Müller
 female athlete: Denise Biellmann – Tina Riegel – Christa Kinshofer

1982 
 actor: Maxwell Caulfield – Adriano Celentano – Arnold Schwarzenegger
 actress: Michelle Pfeiffer – Ornella Muti – Farrah Fawcett
 male singer: Shakin' Stevens – F. R. David – Peter Maffay
 female singer: Nena – Kim Wilde – Frida
 TV star male: Patrick Duffy (Dallas) – Lewis Collins (The Professionals) – Martin Shaw (The Professionals)
 TV star female: Victoria Principal (Dallas) – Jutta Speidel – Linda Gray (Dallas)
 band: Spider Murphy Gang – ABBA – BAP
 male athlete: Karl-Heinz Rummenigge – Pierre Littbarski – Toni Schumacher
 female athlete: Ulrike Meyfarth – Tina Riegel – Denise Biellmann

1983 
 actor: John Travolta – Sylvester Stallone – Mark Hamill
 actress: Jennifer Beals – Sophie Marceau – Cynthia Rhodes
 male singer: Limahl – Shakin' Stevens – Rod Stewart
 female singer: Irene Cara – Kim Wilde – Agnetha Fältskog
 TV star male: John James (Dynasty) – Patrick Duffy (Dallas) – Thomas Gottschalk
 TV star female: Heather Locklear (Dynasty) – Linda Evans (Dynasty) – Victoria Principal (Dallas)
 band: Nena – Kajagoogoo – Culture Club
 athlete: Karl-Heinz Rummenigge – Toni Schumacher – Jean-Marie Pfaff

1984 
 actor: Harrison Ford – Noah Hathaway – Kevin Bacon
 actress: Tami Stronach – Jennifer Beals – Lori Singer
 male singer: Limahl – George Michael – Shakin' Stevens
 female singer: Kim Wilde – Cyndi Lauper – Tina Turner
 TV star male: Tom Selleck (Magnum, P.I.) – John James (Dynasty) – Michael Praed (Robin of Sherwood)
 TV star female: Stefanie Powers (Hart to Hart) – Priscilla Presley (Dallas) – Heather Locklear (Dynasty)
 band: Nena – Duran Duran – Wham!
 athlete: Karl-Heinz Rummenigge – Michael Groß – Toni Schumacher

1985 
 actor: Sylvester Stallone – Michael J. Fox – Götz George
 actress: Jennifer Beals – Grace Jones – Tanya Roberts
 male singer: Falco – Rick Springfield – Bruce Springsteen
 female singer: Madonna – Sandra – Tina Turner
 TV star male: Richard Chamberlain (The Thorn Birds) – Hendrik Martz (Patrik Pacard) – Lee Majors (The Fall Guy)
 TV star female: Heather Thomas (The Fall Guy) – Rachel Ward (The Thorn Birds) – Stefanie Powers (Hart to Hart)
 band: Modern Talking – Duran Duran – a-ha
 athlete: Boris Becker – Aaron Krickstein – Ivan Lendl

1986 
 actor: Tom Cruise – Sylvester Stallone – Ralph Macchio
 actress: Kelly McGillis – Farrah Fawcett – Radost Bokel
 male singer: Falco – Den Harrow – Chris Norman
 female singer Madonna – Samantha Fox – Sandra
 TV star male: Bruce Boxleitner (Scarecrow and Mrs. King) – Hendrik Martz (Die Wicherts von nebenan) – David Hasselhoff (Knight Rider)
 TV star female: Kate Jackson (Scarecrow and Mrs. King) – Catherine Oxenberg (Dynasty) – Heather Thomas (The Fall Guy)
 rock group: a-ha – Modern Talking – Depeche Mode
 hard 'n heavy: Europe – Scorpions – ZZ Top
 athlete: Boris Becker – Steffi Graf – Stefan Edberg

1987 
 actor: Tom Cruise – Sylvester Stallone – Eddie Murphy
 actress: Kelly McGillis – Jennifer Grey – Brigitte Nielsen
 male singer: Den Harrow – Michael Jackson – Rick Astley
 female singer: Madonna – Sandra – Sabrina
 TV star male: Don Johnson (Miami Vice) – Patrick Swayze (North and South) – Bruce Boxleitner (Scarecrow and Mrs. King)
 TV star female: Kate Jackson (Scarecrow and Mrs. King) – Heather Thomas (The Fall Guy) – Lesley-Anne Down (North and South)
 rock group: a-ha – Pet Shop Boys – Depeche Mode
 hard 'n heavy: Europe – Bon Jovi – Whitesnake
 athlete: Steffi Graf – Stefan Edberg – Gabriela Sabatini

1988 
 actor: Patrick Swayze – Sylvester Stallone – Eddie Murphy
 actress: Jennifer Grey – Linda Kozlowski – Kelly McGillis
 male singer: Michael Jackson – Rick Astley – Eros Ramazzotti
 female singer: Sandra – Whitney Houston – Kylie Minogue
 TV star male: David Hasselhoff (Knight Rider) – Don Johnson (Miami Vice) – Bruce Boxleitner (Scarecrow and Mrs. King)
 TV star female: Kate Jackson (Scarecrow and Mrs. King) – Heather Thomas (The Fall Guy) – Silvia Seidel (Anna)
 rock groups: Die Ärzte – a-ha – Bros
 hard 'n heavy: Europe – Bon Jovi – Helloween
 male athlete: Andre Agassi – Jürgen Klinsmann – Stefan Edberg
 female athlete: Steffi Graf – Florence Griffith-Joyner – Anja Fichtel

1989 
 actor: Tom Cruise – Corey Haim – Patrick Swayze
 actress: Kim Basinger – Sophie Marceau – Jennifer Grey
 male singer: Jason Donovan – David Hasselhoff – Michael Jackson
 female singer: Sandra – Madonna – Kylie Minogue
 TV star male: David Hasselhoff (Knight Rider) – Don Johnson (Miami Vice) – Richard Dean Anderson (MacGyver)
 TV star female: Heather Locklear (Dynasty) – Heather Thomas (The Fall Guy) – Andrea Elson (ALF)
 TV moderator: Thomas Gottschalk (Wetten, dass..?) – Kai Böcking – Günther Jauch (Na siehste!)
 band rock/pop: Milli Vanilli – Roxette – Bros
 band hard 'n heavy: Bon Jovi – Europe – Guns N’ Roses
 male athlete: Boris Becker – Andre Agassi – Carl-Uwe Steeb
 female athlete: Steffi Graf – Gabriela Sabatini – Monica Seles

1990 
 actor: Tom Cruise – Patrick Swayze – Richard Gere
 actress: Julia Roberts – Jennifer Grey – Kirstie Alley
 male singer: Matthias Reim – David Hasselhoff – Jason Donovan
 female singer: Sandra – Sinéad O'Connor – Janet Jackson
 TV star male: David Hasselhoff (Baywatch) – Billy Warlock (Baywatch) – Brandon Call (Baywatch)
 TV star female: Erika Eleniak (Baywatch) – Heather Locklear (Dynasty) – Kate Jackson (Scarecrow and Mrs. King)
 TV moderator: Thomas Gottschalk (Wetten, dass..?) – Kai Böcking – Günther Jauch (Na siehste!)
 bands rock/pop: New Kids on the Block – Depeche Mode – Roxette
 bands hard'n heavy: Bon Jovi – Alice Cooper – Europe
 male athlete: Andre Agassi – Jürgen Klinsmann – Lothar Matthäus
 female athlete: Steffi Graf – Katrin Krabbe – Monica Seles

1991 
 actor: Kevin Costner – Arnold Schwarzenegger – Patrick Swayze
 actress: Julia Roberts – Linda Hamilton – Kirstie Alley
 male singer: Bryan Adams – David Hasselhoff – Matthias Reim
 female singer Sandra – Cher – Paula Abdul
 dancefloor: Marky Mark – MC Hammer – Vanilla Ice
 TV star male: David Hasselhoff (Baywatch) – Richard Grieco (21 Jump Street) – Billy Warlock (Baywatch)
 TV star female Erika Eleniak (Baywatch) – Marcy Walker (Santa Barbara) – Heather Locklear (Dynasty)
 TV moderator: Thomas Gottschalk (Wetten, dass..?) – Hape Kerkeling (Total Normal) – Günther Jauch
 band rock/pop: New Kids on the Block – Roxette – Depeche Mode
 band hard 'n heavy: Scorpions – Guns N’ Roses – Bon Jovi
 male athlete: Andre Agassi – Michael Stich – Stefan Edberg
 female athlete: Katrin Krabbe – Steffi Graf – Monica Seles

1992 
 actor: Kevin Costner – Jean-Claude Van Damme – Arnold Schwarzenegger
 actress: Julia Roberts – Sharon Stone – Jodie Foster
 male singer: Michael Jackson – David Hasselhoff – Bryan Adams
 female singer: Sandra – Madonna – Mariah Carey
 dancefloor: Dr. Alban – Marky Mark & The Funky Bunch – Die Fantastischen Vier
 TV star male: Jason Priestley (Beverly Hills, 90210) – Luke Perry (Beverly Hills, 90210) – David Hasselhoff (Baywatch)
 TV star female: Shannen Doherty (Beverly Hills, 90210) – Jennie Garth (Beverly Hills, 90210) – Erika Eleniak (Baywatch)
 TV moderator: Thomas Gottschalk (Wetten, dass..?) – Linda de Mol – Günther Jauch
 band rock/pop: Roxette – New Kids on the Block – Genesis
 band hard 'n heavy: Guns N’ Roses – Mr. Big – Scorpions
 male athlete: Andre Agassi – Boris Becker – Magic Johnson
 female athlete: Franziska van Almsick – Steffi Graf – Heike Henkel
 wrestler: Hulk Hogan – Bret 'Hitman' Hart – The British Bulldog

1993 
 actor: Tom Cruise – Kevin Costner – Jean-Claude Van Damme
 actress: Whoopi Goldberg – Whitney Houston – Julia Roberts
 male singer: Michael Jackson – David Hasselhoff – Eros Ramazzotti
 female singer: Janet Jackson – Whitney Houston – Sandra
 rap & dancefloor: Culture Beat – 2 Unlimited – Haddaway
 TV star male: Luke Perry (Beverly Hills, 90210) – Jason Priestley (Beverly Hills, 90210) – David Charvet (Baywatch)
 TV star female: Shannen Doherty (Beverly Hills, 90210) – Jennie Garth (Beverly Hills, 90210) – Christina Applegate (Married... with Children)
 TV moderator: Kristiane Backer (VJ on MTV) – Linda de Mol – Thomas Gottschalk (Wetten, dass..?)
 band rock/pop: 4 Non Blondes – Take That – Ace of Base
 band hard 'n heavy: Bon Jovi – Guns N’ Roses – Scorpions
 male athlete: Marc-Kevin Goellner – Michael Stich – Michael Schumacher
 female athlete: Franziska van Almsick – Steffi Graf – Anke Huber
 wrestler: Bret 'Hitman' Hart – Hulk Hogan – Lex Luger

1994 
 actor: Keanu Reeves – Tom Hanks – Kevin Costner
 actress: Whoopi Goldberg – Julia Roberts – Winona Ryder
 male singer: Michael Jackson – Joshua Kadison – Bryan Adams
 female singer: Mariah Carey – Janet Jackson – Madonna
 dancefloor: DJ BoBo – 2 Unlimited – Whigfield
 rap & techno: Marusha – Mark 'Oh – The Prodigy
 TV star male: Luke Perry (Beverly Hills, 90210) – Jonathan Brandis (seaQuest DSV) – Joe Lando (Dr. Quinn, Medicine Woman)
 TV star female: Jennie Garth (Beverly Hills, 90210) – Shannen Doherty (Beverly Hills, 90210) – Pamela Anderson (Baywatch)
 TV moderator: Kristiane Backer (VJ on MTV) – Ray Cokes (MTV's Most Wanted) – Arabella Kiesbauer (Arabella)
 band pop: Take That – Worlds Apart – East 17
 band rock: Bon Jovi – Aerosmith – Nirvana

1995 
 actor: Brad Pitt – Tom Hanks – Johnny Depp
 actress: Sandra Bullock – Alicia Silverstone – Whoopi Goldberg
 male singer: Michael Jackson – DJ BoBo – Mark 'Oh
 female singer: Janet Jackson – Mariah Carey – Whigfield
 TV star male:  (Unter uns) – Joe Lando (Dr. Quinn, Medicine Woman) –  (So ist das Leben! Die Wagenfelds)
 TV star female: Heike Makatsch (VJ on VIVA) – Pamela Anderson (Baywatch) – Valerie Niehaus (Verbotene Liebe)
 band pop: The Kelly Family – Caught in the Act – Take That
 band rock: Bon Jovi – Die Ärzte – Green Day

1996 
 actor: Tom Cruise – Brad Pitt – Tom Hanks
 actress: Sandra Bullock – Michelle Pfeiffer – Pamela Anderson
 male singer: Peter André – Michael Jackson – DJ BoBo
 female singer: Blümchen – Alanis Morissette – Mariah Carey
 TV star male: David Duchovny (The X-Files) – Jared Leto (My So-Called Life) –  (Gegen den Wind)
 TV star female: Gillian Anderson (The X-Files) – Jasmin Gerat (Bravo TV) – Valerie Niehaus (Verbotene Liebe)
 band pop: Backstreet Boys – The Kelly Family – Caught in the Act
 band rock: Die Toten Hosen – Bon Jovi – Die Ärzte
 Platinum-OTTO: Bee Gees

1997 
 actor: Leonardo DiCaprio – Will Smith – Brad Pitt
 actress: Claire Danes – Sandra Bullock – Julia Roberts
 male singer: Aaron Carter – Michael Jackson – Puff Daddy
 female singer: Blümchen – Mariah Carey – Janet Jackson
 TV star male: David Duchovny (The X-Files) – Daniel Fehlow (Gute Zeiten, schlechte Zeiten) – Jared Leto (My So-Called Life)
 TV star female: Gillian Anderson (The X-Files) – Rhea Harder (Gute Zeiten, schlechte Zeiten) – Alexandra Neldel (Gute Zeiten, schlechte Zeiten)
 band pop: Backstreet Boys – The Kelly Family – Caught in the Act
 band rock: Bon Jovi – Rammstein – Die Toten Hosen

1998 
 actor: Leonardo DiCaprio – Til Schweiger – David Duchovny
 actress: Kate Winslet – Sandra Bullock – Julia Roberts
 male singer: Oli.P – Sasha – Christian Wunderlich
 female singer: Céline Dion – Blümchen – Young Deenay
 hip-hop & rap: Puff Daddy – Sabrina Setlur – Thomas D
 TV star male: David Duchovny (The X-Files) – Oliver Petszokat (Gute Zeiten, schlechte Zeiten) – Christian Wunderlich (Verbotene Liebe)
 TV star female: Gillian Anderson (The X-Files) – Alexandra Neldel (Gute Zeiten, schlechte Zeiten) – Rhea Harder (Gute Zeiten, schlechte Zeiten)
 band pop: Backstreet Boys – The Kelly Family – Echt
 band rock: Aerosmith – Guano Apes – Die Ärzte

1999 
 actor: Leonardo DiCaprio – Freddie Prinze, Jr. – Ryan Phillippe
 actress: Julia Roberts – Rachael Leigh Cook – Sarah Michelle Gellar
 male singer: Oli.P – Sasha – Lou Bega
 female singer: Britney Spears – Christina Aguilera – Blümchen
 hip-hop:  – Will Smith – Puff Daddy
 TV star male: Tim Sander (Gute Zeiten, schlechte Zeiten) – David Duchovny (The X-Files) – Oliver Petszokat (Gute Zeiten, schlechte Zeiten)
 TV star female: Sarah Michelle Gellar (Buffy the Vampire Slayer) – Gillian Anderson (The X-Files) – Rhea Harder (Gute Zeiten, schlechte Zeiten)
 band: The Kelly Family – Backstreet Boys – Echt

2000 
 actor: Leonardo DiCaprio – Freddie Prinze, Jr. – Brad Pitt
 actress: Julia Roberts – Jennifer Lopez – Sandra Bullock
 male singer: Sasha –  – Robbie Williams
 female singer: Britney Spears – Jeanette Biedermann – Jennifer Lopez
 hip-hop international: Eminem – Puff Daddy – Wu-Tang Clan
 hip-hop national: DJ Tomekk – Fünf Sterne deluxe – Die Fantastischen Vier
 TV star male: David Boreanaz (Buffy the Vampire Slayer) – David Duchovny (The X-Files) – Tim Sander (Gute Zeiten, schlechte Zeiten)
 TV star female: Sarah Michelle Gellar (Buffy the Vampire Slayer) – Jeanette Biedermann (Gute Zeiten, schlechte Zeiten) – Gillian Anderson (The X-Files)
 band pop: The Kelly Family – Backstreet Boys – ATC
 band rock: Bon Jovi – HIM – Limp Bizkit
 comedy star: Stefan Raab (TV total) – Michael Mittermeier – Gaby Köster (Ritas Welt)
 shootingstar male: Craig David
 shootingstar female: Destiny's Child

2001 
 actor: Josh Hartnett – Daniel Radcliffe – Michael 'Bully' Herbig
 actress: Julia Roberts – Jennifer Lopez – Sandra Bullock
 male singer: Robbie Williams – Sasha – Enrique Iglesias
 female singer: Kylie Minogue – Sarah Connor – Britney Spears
 hip-hop international: Nelly – Eminem – Eve
 hip-hop national: Samy Deluxe – Fettes Brot – Blumentopf
 TV star male: David Boreanaz (Buffy the Vampire Slayer) – Felix von Jascheroff (Gute Zeiten, schlechte Zeiten) – James Marsters (Buffy the Vampire Slayer)
 TV star female: Sarah Michelle Gellar (Buffy the Vampire Slayer) – Jeanette Biedermann (Gute Zeiten, schlechte Zeiten) – Melissa Joan Hart (Sabrina the Teenage Witch)
 band pop: No Angels – O-Town – Destiny's Child
 band rock: Linkin Park – Limp Bizkit – Bon Jovi
 comedy star: Stefan Raab (TV total) – Kaya Yanar (Was guckst du?!) – Michael 'Bully' Herbig (Bullyparade)
 shootingstar solo: Shakira
 shootingstar band: Bro'Sis
 special OTTO: DJ BoBo

2002 
 actor: Orlando Bloom – Daniel Radcliffe – Elijah Wood
 actress: Jennifer Lopez – Liv Tyler – Julia Roberts
 male singer: Robbie Williams – Ben – Marlon
 female singer: Jeanette Biedermann – Avril Lavigne – Christina Aguilera
 hip-hop international: Nelly – Eminem – Ja Rule
 hip-hop national: Massive Töne – DJ Tomekk – Fettes Brot
 TV star male: James Marsters (Buffy the Vampire Slayer) – Felix von Jascheroff (Gute Zeiten, schlechte Zeiten) – David Boreanaz (Buffy the Vampire Slayer)
 TV star female: Sarah Michelle Gellar (Buffy the Vampire Slayer) – Jeanette Biedermann (Gute Zeiten, schlechte Zeiten) – Jessica Alba (Dark Angel)
 band pop: No Angels – Natural – Westlife
 band rock: Busted – Linkin Park – Bon Jovi
 comedy star: Stefan Raab (TV total) – Anke Engelke (Anke) – Michael Mittermeier
 shooting star solo: Avril Lavigne
 shooting star band: Busted
 special OTTO: Nena

2003 
 actor: Orlando Bloom – Elijah Wood – Daniel Radcliffe
 actress: Liv Tyler – Emma Watson – Keira Knightley
 male singer: Justin Timberlake – Daniel Küblböck – Alexander Klaws
 female singer: Jeanette Biedermann – Christina Aguilera – Sarah Connor
 hip-hop international: The Black Eyed Peas – Eminem – Sean Paul
 hip-hop national: Eko Fresh – DJ Tomekk – Sabrina Setlur
 TV star male: Felix von Jascheroff (Gute Zeiten, schlechte Zeiten) – Tom Welling (Smallville) – James Marsters (Buffy the Vampire Slayer)
 TV Star female: Jeanette Biedermann (Gute Zeiten, schlechte Zeiten) – Sarah Michelle Gellar (Buffy the Vampire Slayer) – Yvonne Catterfeld (Gute Zeiten, schlechte Zeiten)
 band pop: Overground – No Angels – B3
 band rock: The Rasmus – Linkin Park – Busted
 comedy star: Stefan Raab (TV total) – Anke Engelke (Ladykracher) – Ingo Oschmann (Star Search)
 shooting star: Patrick Nuo
 special OTTO: Kylie Minogue

2004 
 actor: Brad Pitt – Daniel Radcliffe – Orlando Bloom
 actress: Olsen Twins – Hilary Duff – Emma Watson
 male singer: Usher – Alexander Klaws – Robbie Williams
 female singer: Sarah Connor – Jeanette Biedermann – Christina Aguilera
 hip-hop international: 50 Cent – The Black Eyed Peas – Eminem
 hip-hop national: Sido – Die Fantastischen Vier – Samy Deluxe
 TV star male: Chad Michael Murray (Gilmore Girls) – Milo Ventimiglia (Gilmore Girls) –  (Unter uns)
 TV star female: Alexis Bledel (Gilmore Girls) – Olsen Twins – Yvonne Catterfeld (Gute Zeiten, schlechte Zeiten)
 band pop: Silbermond – Overground – Vanilla Ninja
 band rock: Maroon 5 – Linkin Park – The Rasmus
 comedy star: Oliver Pocher (Rent a Pocher) – Michael 'Bully' Herbig – Stefan Raab (TV total)
 shooting star: Juli
 Honorary-OTTO: Scooter
 Platinum-OTTO: Thomas Gottschalk

2005 
 actor: Daniel Radcliffe – Brad Pitt – Jimi Blue Ochsenknecht
 actress: Emma Watson – Angelina Jolie – Jessica Alba
 male singer: Marc Terenzi – Robbie Williams – Xavier Naidoo
 female singer: Sarah Connor – Kelly Clarkson – Christina Stürmer
 hip-hop international: 50 Cent – Eminem – The Black Eyed Peas
 hip-hop national: Fettes Brot – Bushido – Samy Deluxe
 TV star male: Jörn Schlönvoigt (Gute Zeiten, schlechte Zeiten) – Felix von Jascheroff (Gute Zeiten, schlechte Zeiten) – Ben (Bravo TV)
 TV star female: Gülcan (VJ on VIVA) – Alexandra Neldel (Verliebt in Berlin) – Mischa Barton (The O.C.)
 band pop: US5 – Pussycat Dolls – Backstreet Boys
 band rock: Tokio Hotel – Green Day – Rammstein
 comedy star: Oliver Pocher (Rent a Pocher) – Mario Barth – Ralf Schmitz (Die Dreisten Drei)
 school band: nur*so –

2006 
 actor: Johnny Depp – Jimi Blue Ochsenknecht – Zac Efron
 actress: Emma Watson – Keira Knightley – Angelina Jolie
 male singer: Justin Timberlake – Xavier Naidoo – Marc Terenzi
 female singer: Sarah Connor – LaFee – Christina Aguilera
 hip-hop international: Eminem – 50 Cent – 2Pac
 hip-hop national: Bushido – Sido – Eko Fresh
 TV star male: Benjamin McKenzie (The O.C.) – Jörn Schlönvoigt (Gute Zeiten, schlechte Zeiten) – Tim Sander (Verliebt in Berlin)
 TV star female: Gülcan (Bravo TV) – Alyssa Milano (Charmed) – Eva Longoria (Desperate Housewives)
 band pop: US5 – Monrose – Pussycat Dolls
 band rock: Tokio Hotel – Killerpilze – Revolverheld
 comedy star: Oliver Pocher (Pochers WM-Countdown) – Mario Barth – Otto Waalkes
 Honorary OTTO: Beyoncé

2007 
 actor: Benjamin McKenzie – Daniel Radcliffe – Johnny Depp – Jimi Blue Ochsenknecht
 actress: Emma Watson – Keira Knightley – Nora Tschirner
 male singer: Jimi Blue Ochsenknecht – Justin Timberlake – Jörn Schlönvoigt
 female singer: LaFee – Ashley Tisdale – Sarah Connor
 hip-hop international: Timbaland – Eminem – 50 Cent
 hip-hop national: Bushido – Sido – K.I.Z
 TV star male: Zac Efron (High School Musical) – Wentworth Miller (Prison Break) – Drake Bell (Drake & Josh)
 TV star female: Vanessa Hudgens (High School Musical) – Ashley Tisdale (High School Musical) – Miley Cyrus (Hannah Montana)
 band pop: US5 – Monrose – Culcha Candela
 band rock: Linkin Park – Tokio Hotel – Panik
 comedy star: Oliver Pocher (Schmidt & Pocher) – Mario Barth – Stefan Raab (TV total)
 Honorary OTTO: Til Schweiger
 Platinum-OTTO: Dieter Bohlen
 Shootingstar-OTTO: Wentworth Miller

2008 
 actor: Robert Pattinson – Kristen Stewart – Vanessa Hudgens
 singer: Miley Cyrus – Britney Spears – Bushido
 band: Tokio Hotel – US5 – Monrose
 TV star: Zac Efron (High School Musical) – Vanessa Hudgens (High School Musical)

2009 
 actor: Emma Watson – Robert Pattinson – Rupert Grint
 singer: Michael Jackson – Jeanette Biedermann – Selena Gomez
 band: Tokio Hotel – Monrose – Sunrise Avenue
 films: Twilight
 athlete: Matthias Steiner

2010 
 Actor/Actress: Miley Cyrus – Ashley Tisdale – Johnny Depp
 Band: Die Atzen (Frauenarzt and Manny Marc) – Sunrise Avenue – Monrose
 Male singer: Justin Bieber – Michael Jackson – Sido
 Female singer: Kesha – Rihanna – Christina Aguilera
 TV Star – Female: Selena Gomez (Wizards of Waverly Place) –  (Anna und die Liebe) – Jeanette Biedermann (Anna und die Liebe)
 TV Star – Male: Zac Efron – Elyas M'Barek (Doctor's Diary) –  (Anna und die Liebe)
 Shooting Star: Emily Osment

2011 
 Film Star – Male: Robert Pattinson – Matthias Schweighöfer – Johnny Depp
 Film Star – Female: Kristen Stewart – Selena Gomez – Emma Watson
 TV Star – Male: Neil Patrick Harris (How I Met Your Mother) – Tom Beck (Alarm für Cobra 11) – Dieter Bohlen (Deutschland sucht den Superstar)
 TV Star – Female: Selena Gomez (Wizards of Waverly Place) – Daniela Katzenberger – Victoria Justice (Victorious)
 Super Singer – Male: Justin Bieber – Bruno Mars – Michael Jackson
 Super Singer – Female: Rihanna – Adele – Selena Gomez
 Super Rapper: Die Atzen – Pitbull – Casper
 Super Rock Band: Thirty Seconds to Mars – Linkin Park – Tokio Hotel
 Super Pop Band: Big Time Rush – LMFAO – The Black Pony
 Comedian: Bülent Ceylan -  - Mario Barth
 Internet Star: Y-Titty – Justin Bieber – Steve Jobs

2012 
 Film Star – Male: Robert Pattinson – Matthias Schweighöfer – Johnny Depp
 Film Star – Female: Kristen Stewart – Emma Watson – Jennifer Lawrence
 TV Star – Female: Selena Gomez (Wizards of Waverly Place) – Daniela Katzenberger – Nina Dobrev (The Vampire Diaries)
 TV Star – Male: Tom Beck (Alarm für Cobra 11) – Neil Patrick Harris (How I Met Your Mother) – Ian Somerhalder (The Vampire Diaries)
 Super Singer – Male: Daniele Negroni – Luca Hänni – Justin Bieber
 Super Singer – Female: Selena Gomez – Rihanna – Taylor Swift
 Super Rapper: Cro – Casper – Nicki Minaj
 Super Rock Band: Linkin Park – Die Toten Hosen – Green Day
 Super Pop Band: One Direction – Big Time Rush – Jedward
 Comedian: Bülent Ceylan – Cindy aus Marzahn – Kaya Yanar
 Internet-Star: Y-Titty – Cimorelli – One Direction

2013 
 Superstar: Samu Haber – Justin Bieber – Daniele Negroni
 TV-Star: Tom Beck (Alarm für Cobra 11) – Ian Somerhalder (The Vampire Diaries) – Bülent Ceylan
 Movie Star: Josh Hutcherson – Jennifer Lawrence – Matthias Schweighöfer
 Newcomer of the Year: Little Mix – James Arthur – Macklemore
 Checker of the Year: Louis Tomlinson – Justin Bieber – Kay One
 Sexy Babe: Selena Gomez – Miley Cyrus – Rihanna
 Super-Hottie: Harry Styles – Tom Beck – Luca Hänni
 Super-BFFs: Selena Gomez & Taylor Swift – Justin Bieber & Chris Brown – Vanessa Hudgens & Ashley Tisdale
 Hot Couple of the Year: Sarah & Pietro – Perrie Edwards & Zayn Malik – Jim Parsons & Todd Spiewak

2015 
 Super-male-Singer: Ed Sheeran – Tom Beck – Justin Bieber
 Super-female-Singer: Lena – Jasmine Thompson – Ariana Grande
 Super-Band: One Direction – Fifth Harmony – Sunrise Avenue
 Super-Rapper: Farid Bang – Cro – Nicki Minaj
 Super-Film-Star male: Elyas M’Barek – Max von der Groeben – Josh Hutcherson
 Super-Film-Star female: Jella Haase – Jennifer Lawrence – Anna Kendrick
 Super-TV-Star male: Jorge Blanco – Joko & Klaas – Ian Somerhalder
 Super-TV-Star female: Martina Stoessel – Palina Rojinski – Kaley Cuoco
 Social-Media-Star:  –  –

2016 
 Social-Media-Star: Lisa and Lena
 Super-female-Singer: Martina Stoessel
 Super-male Singer: Shawn Mendes
 Super-Band: New District
 Super-Film/TV-Star female: Karol Sevilla
 Super-Film/TV-Star male: Ruggero Pasquarelli

2017 

 Super-Film/TV-Star: Tim Oliver Schultz
 Super-Singer: Shawn Mendes
 Super-Band/Duo: Marcus & Martinus
 Super-Social-Media: Die Lochis

2021 

 Best Series: Riverdale, 13 Reasons Why, Stranger Things
 Singer: Shawn Mendes, Mike Singer, Lina
 Band/Duo: Blackpink, Marcus & Martinus
 Hip-Hop: Cardi B, Loredana, Bausa
 YouTuber: Bianca Heinicke, Joey Heindle

References

External links 
 Winners
 Alle OTTO-Sieger seit 1957
 Bravo Otto at the Internet Movie Database

Awards established in 1957
German film awards
German music awards
German television awards
1957 establishments in Germany